The Lowville and Beaver River Railroad  is a short-line railroad that was owned by Genesee Valley Transportation (GVT) of Batavia, New York from 1993 to Wednesday, January 24, 2007.  Map 

The Lowville & Beaver River runs from an interchange, with GVT subsidiary Mohawk, Adirondack and Northern Railroad (MHWA) at Lowville, NY to Croghan, New York.

History

The Lowville & Beaver River Railroad was originally part of the Utica & Black River Railroad (U&BR). The U&BR reached Lowville in 1868 and Cartage in 1871. There was an 11-mile branch line from Lowville through Beaver Falls to Croghan planned in 1880 but it was not built.

In 1903 James P. Lewis backed the short line to serve his mills at Beaver Falls. The Lowville & Beaver River Railroad was open on January 13, 1906.

The L&BR was dieselized in 1947, while #1923, their remaining steam locomotive, was last used on standby service in case the diesel needed repairs. It last operated in January 1957. The locomotives of the L&BR were numbered 10, 12, 51, 1912, 1923, 1947 (Diesel), 1950 (Diesel), 1951 (Diesel) and 8, a Shay owned by the Railway Historical Society of Northern New York. All of the diesels are GE 44-tonners.

From 2010 to 2012, Lewis County and GVT negotiated the sale of the LBR infrastructure to the county. Plans called for the LBR route, which was offered for $425,000, to be used for a museum train operated by the Railroad Society of Northern New York, which had been based in Croghan in the mid-1990s. The MHWA route from Lowville to Carthage was also to be sold to the county and converted to a rail trail. On April 30, 2012, however, the county decided against purchasing the infrastructure.

River Marine Inc. of Cape Vincent, NY recently purchased the former Carthage train depot on Mechanic Street. River Marine also owns the railway yard in Lowville, NY. Ronald J. Trottier the owner of River Marine Inc. plans to lease the railroad between Cartage and Lowville. His plan is to run tourist trains and rail bikes, human-pedal-powered open air vehicles that ride the rails.

The #1923 steam locomotive, an Alco 2-8-0, has been preserved as part of the Steamtown, USA National Historic Site, Scranton, PA.

Infrastructure
The 16.8 km long route of the LBR runs from Lowville through the valley of the Beaver River via New Bremen and Beaver Falls to Croghan. In Lowville, there is a connection to the MHWA route to Carthage, which is part of a connection formerly running from Utica to Clayton on the St. Lawrence River, but whose section from Lowville south to Lyons Falls was closed in 1964. The LBR has a small depot in Lowville.

The branch line crosses the Black River on a  1,100 foot long Warren swing through truss bridge.

Operations
The MHWA Lowville-to-Carthage branch line has been virtually out-of-service since the mid-1990s and is currently, as of May, 2022 out-of-service. The L&BR was placed out of service after the paper mill in Beaver Falls closed on January 24, 2007. The future usage of the line is yet to be determined.

External links
CNYrailroadnut's Lowville & Beaver River Railroad picture gallery
Railway Historical Society of Northern New York
More

References

 

New York (state) railroads
Railway companies established in 1903